Mayfield is an area south of Braemar in Umzinto, South Africa, surrounded by Mbungulu, Braemar, and Mkhunya/Dumisa. It is located under Ugu District Municipality at an offramp, D307 in Sawoti, opposite Sawoti Police Station, that road goes to Mbungulu and Ncazuka.

In this area is where you will find Himmelberg Intermediate School, Mayfield and the road, D307 will also take you to Phungula Primary School, kwaMbungulu.

References

Populated places in the Umdoni Local Municipality